Quentin Braat (born 6 July 1997) is a French professional footballer who plays as a goalkeeper for Segunda División club Oviedo.

Professional career
On 25 May 2017, Braat signed his first professional contract with FC Nantes. On 30 June 2019, he went on loan to Niort for the 2019-20 Ligue 2 season. Braat made his professional debut with Niort in a 2-0 Ligue 2 loss to Troyes AC on 26 July 2019. He left Niort at the end of the 2021–22 season having made 55 appearances for the club in all competitions.

On 1 July 2022, Braat signed a three-year contract with Oviedo in Spain.

References

External links
 
 

Living people
1997 births
Sportspeople from Fontainebleau
Association football goalkeepers
French footballers
France youth international footballers
FC Nantes players
Chamois Niortais F.C. players
Real Oviedo players
Ligue 2 players
Championnat National 2 players
Championnat National 3 players
Footballers from Seine-et-Marne
French expatriate footballers
Expatriate footballers in Spain
French expatriate sportspeople in Spain
French people of Dutch descent